Gemenefkhonsbak was an ancient Egyptian ruler ("king") of Tanis during the 25th Dynasty.

Biography
Little is known of him. According to Kenneth Kitchen, he ruled Tanis from around 700 to c. 680 BCE some time after the fall of the last Tanite pharaoh of the 22nd Dynasty, Osorkon IV, which occurred shortly after 716 BCE. Like many of the Nile Delta governors, he proclaimed himself king, adopting a royal titulary.

His successor as ruler of Tanis could have been Sehetepibenre Pedubast.

Attestations
Few monuments bearing his name were found. The better known among these is a hieratic stele from Heliopolis and now in the Museo Egizio of Turin; on this stele,  this king is depicted while spearing a foreigner who lies before Osiris. According to Miroslav Verner, a scaraboid seal of unknown origin reading Shepeskare, which Flinders Petrie attributed to pharaoh Shepseskare of the 5th Dynasty at the beginning of the 20th century, may instead belong to Gemenefkhonsbak.

References

8th-century BC Pharaohs
7th-century BC Pharaohs
Non-dynastic pharaohs
People of the Twenty-fifth Dynasty of Egypt